Gordon James Beck (16 September 1935 – 6 November 2011) was an English jazz pianist and composer. At the time of his death, 26 albums had been released under his name.

Early life
Beck was born in Brixton, London, and attended Pinner County Grammar School – the school Reg Dwight (Elton John) and Simon Le Bon later attended. He had a sister, Judy. He studied piano in his youth, but decided to pursue a career as an engineering technical draughtsman and moved to Canada in 1957 for this reason.

Later life and career
Largely self-taught, he returned to music after returning from Canada in 1958, where he had been exposed to the works of George Shearing and Dave Brubeck.

Beck became a professional musician in 1960. That year, he played with saxophonist Don Byas in Monte Carlo. Beck joined the Tubby Hayes group in 1962 back in England. He led his own bands from 1965, including Gyroscope, from 1968, a trio with bassist Jeff Clyne and drummer Tony Oxley. Beck first played with vocalist Helen Merrill in 1969 and continued the relationship into the 1990s when she toured Europe. From 1969 to 1972 he toured with saxophonist Phil Woods's European Rhythm Machine. Beck recorded ten albums with Woods.

In the 1960s and 1970s he was a house pianist at Ronnie Scott's Jazz Club. Beck also played "experimental funk in the Swiss musician George Gruntz's six-keyboard group Piano Conclave (1973-75), and free jazz with [...] British improv drummer John Stevens (1977, 1982)." Beck was a member of Nucleus between 1973 and 1974.

From middle age, Beck played predominantly in mainland Europe. He also recorded albums with Allan Holdsworth, Henri Texier, Didier Lockwood and others. He often played solo from the 1980s and started teaching music at the same point. He toured Japan with Holdsworth in 1985. Beck stopped performing around 2005 because of poor health. He died in Ely, Cambridgeshire, on 6 November 2011.

Playing style
Describing Beck, in his obituary for The Guardian, jazz critic John Fordham said: "He hardly ever played a cliche; he struck notes with a steely precision or a glistening delicacy depending on the mood, and his solos developed in constantly changing phrase lengths and rhythms that never sounded glib or routine."

References

External links
[ All Music]
BBC Music
Discography

1935 births
2011 deaths
English jazz pianists
20th-century British pianists
20th-century English musicians
Musicians from London
Nucleus (band) members
People from Brixton
People from Pinner
Gramavision Records artists